Robert Alan Laing (born March 5, 1958) is an American college basketball coach, currently an assistant at the University of Central Florida. He had been the head men's basketball coach at Campbell University from 2003 to 2013. In March 2013, Laing was fired as head coach at Campbell, finishing with a 114-185 record. He was hired as an assistant under Michael Curry at Florida Atlantic in May 2014.

Head coaching record

References

External links
FAU bio

1958 births
Living people
American men's basketball coaches
Auburn Tigers men's basketball coaches
Basketball coaches from Michigan
Basketball players from Michigan
Campbell Fighting Camels basketball coaches
Clemson Tigers men's basketball coaches
College men's basketball head coaches in the United States
Florida Atlantic Owls men's basketball coaches
Georgia Southern Eagles men's basketball coaches
Junior college men's basketball coaches in the United States
Kansas State Wildcats men's basketball coaches
Northwest Florida State Raiders men's basketball players
People from Hancock, Michigan
Seminole State College of Florida alumni
Southern Miss Golden Eagles basketball coaches
Troy Trojans men's basketball coaches
Troy Trojans men's basketball players
Vanderbilt Commodores football players
UCF Knights men's basketball coaches

Western Kentucky Hilltoppers basketball coaches
American men's basketball players